Nicholas John Allanby (born 24 August 1957) was an Australian cricket player, who played for Tasmania. He was a right-handed batsman and right arm medium pace bowler who played for the side between 1979 and 1983.

References

External links 

1957 births
Living people
Australian cricketers
Tasmania cricketers
Cricketers from Hobart